The Kawasaki Ki-96 was a Japanese single seat, twin-engine heavy fighter of World War II. It was intended to replace the Kawasaki Ki-45s of the Imperial Japanese Army Air Service. However, it was not adopted and only three prototypes were built.

Design and development
The success of the Kawasaki Ki-45 led Kawasaki to start development of an evolved version, on Kawasaki's own authority, in August 1942. Like the Ki-45, the proposed design was a two-seat, twin-engine fighter, but larger and using more powerful engines. In December 1942 the Koku Hombu (Imperial Japanese Army Aviation Bureau) showed interest, but asked Kawasaki to complete the aircraft as single-seat fighters. The first prototype, which was converted while being produced and which retained the larger cockpit canopy intended for the two-seater, flew in September 1943. The two remaining prototypes were built from the start as single-seaters and were fitted with a smaller canopy.

Despite demonstrating performance exceeding estimates and excellent handling, the Army's requirements had changed back to a two-seat fighter, so further development of the Ki-96 was stopped. The wings and tail unit of the Ki-96 would however form part of the structure of the Ki-102 two-seat fighter.

Specifications (Kawasaki Ki-96)

See also

References

Notes

Bibliography

  (new edition 1987 by Putnam Aeronautical Books, .)

External links

 Century of Flight: Kawasaki Ki-96

Ki-096
Ki-096, Kawasaki
Low-wing aircraft
Ki-096, Kawasaki
Aircraft first flown in 1943
Twin piston-engined tractor aircraft